The Burlesque Hall of Fame (BHOF) is the world's only museum dedicated to the history, preservation, and future of the art of burlesque. Located in the Las Vegas Arts district at 1027 S Main st. #110, BHOF is a tourist destination and non-profit 501 (c)(3) educational organization offering tours of its vast Collection of costumes, memorabilia, props and ephemera from burlesque's heyday through contemporary practice; classes for individuals and groups at all levels including beginner; movie screenings; research access for students and journalists; and a gift shop.

Formerly known as Exotic World, the museum began as the personal collection of striptease artist and founding member of The Exotic Dancers' League of America Jennie Lee. After her death in 1990, her friend and fellow entertainer, Dixie Evans, created the museum in Helendale, California, and launched the "Miss Exotic World" Competition in 1990.

In 2006, The Burlesque Hall of Fame relocated from Helendale to Las Vegas, NV, to establish itself as a permanent tourist attraction and exhibition space for its collection. After nearly a decade in the Emergency Arts building in the heart of a revitalized Downtown Las Vegas, the museum moved to Las Vegas' Arts district in 2018.

This Miss Exotic World competition is in its 29th year (as of 2019), and has grown to become The Burlesque Hall of Fame Weekender, a four-day convention held annually in Las Vegas that includes class, vending, museum tours, pin-up safaris, and four nights of showcases: Movers, Shakers, and Innovators; The Titans of Tease Reunion (now in its 68th year); The Miss Exotic World Competition; and Icons and All-Stars.

History
Retired dancer Jennie Lee started collecting burlesque memorabilia when she owned the Sassy Lassy nightclub in San Pedro, California. After Lee was diagnosed with breast cancer, she and her husband moved to an abandoned goat farm in Helendale, California, located in the Mojave Desert about one third of the way between Los Angeles, California and Las Vegas, Nevada.

Lee intended to create a burlesque museum, found a burlesque school and run a bed and breakfast, and the goat farm site had enough room to contain her growing collection. Only the museum got started within her lifetime.

After Lee died in 1990, Dixie Evans took over the farm and turned it into The Exotic World Burlesque Museum, aided by Lee's widower, Charlie Arroyo. Lee's memorabilia formed the core of the collection, but people from around the world soon started to donate items to Exotic World. The collection grew large enough to fill the entire farm.

In late 2005, the museum was temporarily closed for inventory and renovations in the wake of Arroyo's unexpected death and significant weather damage to the museum facilities. Although the museum was not open at the time of the annual Miss Exotic World Pageant in 2006, the pageant was nevertheless held at an alternate venue, the Celebrity Theater in Las Vegas. In 2006, the Burlesque Hall of Fame relocated from Helendale to a temporary space in The Las Vegas Emergency Arts building.

The Hall of Fame relocated to a permanent premises in S Main Street, Las Vegas in April 2018.

Legends of Burlesque
The Burlesque Hall of Fame does not have a formal induction process. The museum is dedicated to celebrating and honoring the entire history of burlesque. A "Living Legend of the Year" award is presented annually during the BHOF Weekender to a performer who has made a significant contribution to burlesque history. BHOF also presents a "Sassy Lassy" award to a person who has contributed significantly to the promotion and preservation of the art of burlesque.

Living Legend of the Year recipients include:

2019 Camille 2000
2018 Kitten Natividad
2017 Lottie the Body
2016 Dee Milo
2015 April March
2014 Toni Elling
2013 Tai Ping
2012 La Savona
2011 Barbara Yung
2010 Betty Rowland
2009 Satan's Angel
2007 Tura Satana
2004 Tempest Storm
2003 Mitzi Sinclaire

Sassy Lassy recipients include:

2019 Simone de la Getto
2018 Indigo Blue
2017 Ophelia Flame
2016 Ursulina
2016 Fisherman
2015 Otter (Blue Angel)
2015 Bonnie Dunn (Blue Angel)
2015 Bambi the Mermaid (Burlesque on the Beach)
2015 Dick Zigun (Burlesque on the Beach)
2015 Madison Stone (Burlesque pioneer and scream queen)
2014 Torchy Taboo
2014 Grant Philipo
2014 Vivienne VaVoom
2013 Katy K
2013 Catherine D'Lish
2013 Scott Ewalt
2012 Dita Von Teese
2012 Don Spiro
2012 Jo "Boobs" Weldon
2011 Billie Madley
2011 Baby Doe Von Stoheim (Tease-O-Rama)
2011 Alison Fensterstock (Tease-O-Rama)
2011 Debbie Mink (Tease-O-Rama)
2011 Alan Perowski (Tease-O-Rama)
2011 Michelle Carr

Museum collection
The Exotic World museum collection includes costumes, props, posters, photographs, publicity stills, newspaper clippings, and playbills related to famous burlesque performers including Dita Von Teese, Blaze Starr, Lili St. Cyr, Chesty Morgan, Candy Barr and Tempest Storm.

The museum includes costume elements and props such as feather boas, fans, gloves, garter belts, gowns, shoes, pasties, g-strings, and jewelry. Many of these items are specially made for use in striptease routines.

Unique individual items include ivory fans used by Sally Rand, gloves and a black velvet shoulder cape worn by Gypsy Rose Lee, a heart-shaped couch owned by Jayne Mansfield and the cremation ashes of Miss Sheri Champagne.

Film
The history of the Burlesque Hall of Fame is the featured subject of the 2010 documentary Exotic World & the Burlesque Revival. Dixie Evans appears in Leslie Zemeckis' documentary Behind the Burly Q.

Miss Exotic World Pageant

Exotic World hosts the annual Miss Exotic World pageant on the first Saturday of every June. Each year a Neo-burlesque performer is crowned Miss Exotic World in a contest often referred to as the Miss America of burlesque. Winners receive both the title and a trophy.

Evolving from annual celebrations for the Exotic Dancers League union, Dixie Evans initiated the Miss Exotic World pageant in 1990 as a way to draw people to the museum. She garnered attention by sending out a press release claiming that "Lili St. Cyr, Tempest Storm, Blaze Starr and 30 other alumni of burlesque will all be invited to attend this reunion." While technically true, none of those invitees attended that year. However, the release garnered press attention for the pageant, which was successful enough to become an annual event.

Each contest features burlesque performances by both stars from burlesque's golden age and younger women involved in the New Burlesque scene.

Miss Exotic World, Reigning Queen of Burlesque 2019

" Frankie Fictitious " 
First runner Up                                        Second Runner up

RedBone                                                 Lou Lou la Duchesse De Riere

Best Boylesque: Joshua Dean

Best Debut: Dahlia Fatale

Most Classic:Holly's Good

Most Comical: Faye Havoc & Donna Boss Rogers

Most Innovative: Lou Lou la Duchesse De Riere

Most Dazzling Dancer: Frankie Fictitious

Best Small Group: Kitten ‘N’ Lou

Best Large Group: Mod Carousel

References 

Fox, Margalit (10 August 2013). "Dixie Evans, Who brought 'Monroe' to Burlesque houses, Dies at 86". The New York Times.P.A21.
"Dixie Evans Obituary". The Telegraph.

External links
Official website
Behind the Burly Q. 2010 documentary film by Leslie Zemeckis
Exotic World & the Burlesque Revival. 2010 documentary film by Red Tremmel

Burlesque
Halls of fame in Nevada
History museums in Nevada
Museums in Las Vegas
Theatre museums in the United States
Women's halls of fame
Museums established in 1990
1990 establishments in California
2006 establishments in Nevada